Gidget is an American sitcom television series by Screen Gems about a surfing, boy-crazy teenager called "Gidget" and her widowed father Russ Lawrence, a UCLA professor. Sally Field stars as Gidget with Don Porter as father Russell Lawrence. The series was first broadcast on ABC from September 15, 1965 to April 21, 1966.  Reruns were aired until September 1, 1966.

Gidget was among the first regularly scheduled color programs on ABC.  With a Wednesday-night time slot that put it in direct competition with The Beverly Hillbillies and The Virginian, it did poorly in the Nielsen ratings and was cancelled at the end of its first season.

Background
The television series was based upon concepts and characters created by Frederick Kohner in his 1957 novel Gidget, the Little Girl with Big Ideas, which Kohner based upon the adventures of his teenaged daughter Kathy. The novel was adapted into a 1959 movie starring Sandra Dee, James Darren, and Cliff Robertson. The 1965 weekly half-hour television series is seen by some as a sequel to the 1959 film, despite numerous discontinuities in plot, time frame, and other details. It can also be seen as an independent incarnation, related to, but distinct from either the novels or the films. Kohner served as a script consultant on the show.

The series reintroduced Gidget's friend Larue and married sister Anne Cooper, both of whom appear in Kohner's original novel, but are absent from the motion-picture series. Gidget's brother-in-law, who appears in the novels as the intelligent but condescending child psychiatrist Larry Cooper, is reinvented in the television series as John Cooper, an obtuse but lovable psychology student.

Plot
Gidget centers  on the father-daughter relationship between Frances "Gidget" Lawrence and her widowed father Russell Lawrence. Episodes follow Gidget's adventures in school, at home, and at nearby beaches. Russell Lawrence guides his 15-year-old daughter, while married sister Anne and husband John offer often unsolicited child-rearing tips. Gidget's friend Larue sometimes takes part in her escapades. More often than not, Gidget receives moral instruction from her father and gains wisdom from her experiences.

Each episode is narrated by Gidget; on occasion, she breaks the "fourth wall" and directly addresses her audience, usually reflecting on what she has learned from the evening's story, and sometimes ending with "Toodles!" (an expression Field improvised during production). The explained pilot that her boyfriend called her Gidget because of her demure, petite build and short stature: girl midget, gidget!

Characters

 Frances Elizabeth "Gidget" Lawrence (Sally Field) is the prototypical southern California beach bunny.
 Russell Lawrence (Don Porter) is Gidget's widowed father and an English professor at UCLA.
 Anne Cooper (Betty Conner) is Gidget's older, married sister.
 John Cooper (Pete Duel) is Anne's husband, a psychology student.
 Larue Wilson (Lynette Winter) is Gidget's best friend.
 Jeff "Moondoggie" Matthews (Stephen Mines) is Gidget's boyfriend, who is away at Princeton University.
 Siddo (Michael Nader) is Gidget's schoolmate.
 Randy (Rickie Sorensen) is Gidget's schoolmate.

While Jeff was Gidget's true love (she regularly wore his high-school ring around her neck), she regularly dated — or more accurately, pursued — other boys while he was away at college. 
 Kahuna (Martin Milner) - "The Great Kahuna"
 Jack Collins (James Davidson) - "A Hearse, a Hearse, My Kingdom for a Hearse"
 Roger Haimes (James M. Crawford) - "Image Scrimmage"
 Mark (Robert Random) - "Chivalry Isn't Dead", "Gidget's Foreign Policy"
 Bret (Randy Kirby) - "The War Between Men, Women and Gidget"
 Tom Brighton (Daniel J. Travanti) - "Now There's a Face"
 Corky Cook (Peter Brooks), Tate Cook (Larry Merrill) - "Too Many Cooks"
 Baxter Stevenson (Tom Gilleran) - "I Love You, I Love You, I Love You, I Think"
 Durf the Drag (Richard Dreyfuss) - "Ego-a-Go-Go"
 Scott (Carl Reindel), Richie Ryan (David Macklin) - "Love and the Single Gidget"
 Toby (Robert Beach) - "I Have This Friend Who..."

Production
The show launched the career of 18-year-old Sally Field, who defeated 75 other teenaged girls for the title role. Field exaggerated her surfing experience to the show's casting directors during her audition (she had none); she later took lessons from Phil Sauers just to be able to pretend to surf for the cameras. Sauers served as the series' "surfing technical consultant" and provided the surfboards used during filming of the series.

Don Porter had portrayed Gidget's father, Russell Lawrence, two years prior in the film Gidget Goes to Rome and was asked to reprise the role for the series.

While the Gidget of the novel and the original film are both blondes, the Gidget of the television series is a brunette.

The lyrics of the theme song "(Wait 'Til You See) My Gidget" were written by Howard Greenfield, with music by Jack Keller. The song was performed in the pilot by The Four Freshmen, and in the series by Johnny Tillotson.

In the credits for the pilot episode, John Cooper is listed as "Larry".

The show ranked 68th out of 108 shows airing that season with a 26.8% audience share.

Episodes

Home media
On March 21, 2006, Sony Pictures Home Entertainment released Gidget: The Complete Series featuring all 32 episodes of the series, on DVD in Region 1. The release included the original pilot episode and a short interview with Field. 

On August 27, 2013, Mill Creek Entertainment announced it had acquired the rights to various television series from the Sony Pictures library, including Gidget. They subsequently re-released the complete series on DVD on May 20, 2014.

Reception
Gidget faced stiff competition during its initial run. The show originally aired on Wednesdays at 8:30 pm, opposite The Beverly Hillbillies (CBS) and The Virginian (NBC), two established shows with strong ratings. The series was moved to Thursdays at 8:00 pm starting with episode 18 ("Like Voodoo"), where it performed poorly opposite CBS's Gilligan's Island, despite airing after the top-five rated Batman.

ABC cancelled Gidget in April 1966, just as the show began to find a large teen audience. Summer reruns launched the show into the top 10 as viewers looked for programs they had not seen during their original fall/winter broadcasts. ABC had a belated hit on its hands, but refused to renew the show because it would have to admit its cancellation was premature. In addition, industry practice at the time rarely allowed for cancelled shows to be resurrected.

Rather than squander the newly found audience for which ABC was hurting at the time, the network scrambled to find a new starring vehicle for Field. The result was The Flying Nun (1967–70), where Field reluctantly portrayed Sister Bertrille for three seasons. Field later commented that she has great affection for her young persona and was proud of her work on Gidget, but was embarrassed with The Flying Nun.

Legacy

Gidget remained in regular syndication for several years, one of the few single-season programs to attain this status. Two made-for-television films followed after its demise: Gidget Grows Up (1969) and Gidget Gets Married (1972).

The series gained a new wave of popularity starting in 1983, when reruns began airing on a regular basis (along with The Flying Nun). Another television movie, Gidget's Summer Reunion, was produced in 1985 starring Caryn Richman in the title role. The movie was successful enough to warrant a syndicated sequel series, The New Gidget, with Richman reprising her role. None of the original cast members appeared on the new series, though original series producer Harry Ackerman was present.

Episodes of Gidget are available for purchase on iTunes, as is streaming for free through The Minisode Network in the U.S. on Hulu and Crackle.

Antenna TV began airing the show in summer 2011 on weekends, paired with The Flying Nun. The entire series was broadcast during an Independence Day marathon in 2012 and 2013, and a Memorial Day marathon in 2016 and 2017.

As of August 2018, the series was available on Amazon Prime video.

Merchandise
Milton Bradley Company manufactured a "Gidget Fortune Teller" game, which used Field's image on the box, the playing board, and several game cards.

See also
 Surf culture
 Psycho Beach Party, a film by Charles Busch parodying the teen beach-party movies of the 1960s

References

External links

 
 
 The Real Gidget, essay by Deanne Stillman about Kathy Kohner Zuckerman
 In Malibu, Gidget's Up Interview with Zuckerman, Washington Post, September 16, 2005

1965 American television series debuts
1966 American television series endings
1960s American sitcoms
American Broadcasting Company original programming
American teen sitcoms
English-language television shows
Gidget
Television series about teenagers
Television series by Sony Pictures Television
Television shows set in Santa Monica, California
Television shows based on American novels
Television series by Screen Gems